Le Bris, or Bris, is a surname, and may refer to:

Gilbert Le Bris (1949–), French politician 
Jean-Marie Le Bris (1817–1879), French sea captain and aviation pioneer 
Michel Le Bris (1944 – 2021)
Pierre-Louis Le Bris (1929–2015), French actor known under the screen name Pierre Brice 
Régis Le Bris, French football manager
Théo Le Bris (born 2002), French footballer

Breton-language surnames